Sherman Township is a township in Grant County, Kansas, United States.  As of the 2000 census, its population was 498.

Geography
According to the USGS, it contains one cemetery, Shockey.

The stream of Wolf Creek runs through this township.

References
 USGS Geographic Names Information System (GNIS)

External links
 City-Data.com

Townships in Grant County, Kansas
Townships in Kansas